Žabǉak Municipality is one of the municipalities of Montenegro. The municipality is located in northwestern part of Montenegro, being part of Durmitor region. The administrative center is small town of Žabǉak.

Location and tourism
Žabljak is centre of Montenegro's mountain tourism. The entire area of Durmitor mountain is protected as a national park, and offers great possibilities for both winter and summer mountain tourism. The town of Žabljak is in the centre of the Durmitor mountain region and with an altitude of 1,456 metres, it is the highest situated town on the Balkans. Among the main tourist attractions of Durmitor are 18 glacier lakes; the biggest and closest to Žabljak being Crno jezero, (literally "Black Lake"). Durmitor's slopes are also becoming increasingly popular among snowboarders.

One problem hampering the development of Žabljak as major regional mountain tourism destination is the lack of quality road infrastructure. The situation has been improving somewhat in recent years. Žabljak's main road connection with the rest of Montenegro is the road that links Žabljak with Mojkovac and the E65, the main road connection between the Montenegrin coast, Podgorica and the north. The other significant road connection is through Šavnik and Nikšić, on to Risan or Podgorica. Since 2010, with the reconstruction of the Risan-Žabljak road, the average trip from Žabljak to the Adriatic sea is shortened to circa two hours.

Municipal parliament
The municipal parliament consists of 31 deputies elected directly for a four-year term.

Demographics
Town of Žabljak is the administrative centre of the Žabljak municipality, which has a population of 4,204, according to 2011 census. The town of Žabljak itself has a population of 1,937, and there are no other bigger settlements in the Municipality. According to the last national census of 2011 the Municipality is made up of the following ethnic groups; 50.43% of Montenegrins and 41.30% of Serbs, while 6.96% of the residents were undeclared. By language 61% spoke Serbian, while 32.39% spoke Montenegrin. By religious affiliation, Eastern Orthodoxy was largely predominant with a 93.72% following.

Gallery

References

 
Municipalities of Montenegro